Afigya Sekyere West is one of the constituencies represented in the Parliament of Ghana. It elects one Member of Parliament (MP) by the first past the post system of election. Afigya Sekyere West is located in the Afigya-Sekyere district  of the Ashanti Region of Ghana. The constituency became defunct after the electoral commission rezoned and merged some constituencies ahead of the 2012 parliamentary elections.

Boundaries
The seat is located within the Afigya-Sekyere District of the Ashanti Region of Ghana.

Members of Parliament

Elections

See also
 List of Ghana Parliament constituencies

References 

Parliamentary constituencies in the Ashanti Region